Hang Hau Village is a village in Sai Kung District, New Territories, Hong Kong.

History
At the time of the 1911 census, the population of Hang Hau was 387. The number of males was 262.

See also
 Hang Hau

References

External links

 Delineation of area of existing village Hang Hau (Hang Hau) for election of resident representative (2019 to 2022)

 

Villages in Sai Kung District, Hong Kong